Wilder Apartments, also known as Emerald Manor, is an Early Commercial-style apartment building in Eugene, Oregon that was built in 1927.  It was listed on the National Register of Historic Places in 2006.

The three-story building has 20 units.  Each originally had at least one Murphy bed built in.

The Wilder Apartments were found to meet historical significance criteria laid out in a 2000 study of "Residential Architecture in Eugene, Oregon, 1850-1950".

References

Buildings and structures in Eugene, Oregon
National Register of Historic Places in Eugene, Oregon
Apartment buildings on the National Register of Historic Places in Oregon
Residential buildings completed in 1927
1927 establishments in Oregon